Quezon's 2nd congressional district is one of the four congressional districts of the Philippines in the province of Quezon, formerly Tayabas. It has been represented in the House of Representatives of the Philippines since 1916 and earlier in the Philippine Assembly from 1907 to 1916. The district consists of Quezon's capital city of Lucena and adjacent municipalities of Candelaria, Dolores, San Antonio, Sariaya and Tiaong. It is currently represented in the 19th Congress by David C. Suarez of Lakas–CMD.

Representation history

Election results

2022

2019

2016

2013

2010

See also
Legislative districts of Quezon

References

Congressional districts of the Philippines
Politics of Quezon
1907 establishments in the Philippines
Congressional districts of Calabarzon
Constituencies established in 1907